Actinotrophon is a genus of sea snails, marine gastropod mollusks in the family Muricidae, the murex snails or rock snails.

Species
Species within the genus Actinotrophon include:
 Actinotrophon actinophorus (Dall, 1889)
 Actinotrophon fragilis (Houart, 1996)
 Actinotrophon tenuis (Houart, 2001)
Species brought into synonymy
 Actinotrophon planispina (E. A. Smith, 1892): synonym of Enixotrophon planispinus (E. A. Smith, 1906)

References

External links
 Barco, A.; Marshall, B.; Houart, R.; Oliverio, M. (2015). Molecular phylogenetics of Haustrinae and Pagodulinae (Neogastropoda: Muricidae) with a focus on New Zealand species. Journal of Molluscan Studies. 81(4): 476-488